Treri (or ,; Latin:  or ) is the name of a Thracian tribe.

In Thrace
The Treri lived in northwest Thrace, in the region of Serdica (now the Bulgarian capital city of Sofia). The Treri of the Serdica region were later absorbed by the Triballi during this latter tribe's eastward migration and disappeared from history afterwards.

In Anatolia
At some point in the 7th century BCE, a portion of the Treres migrated across the Thracian Bosporus and invaded Anatolia. By the later part of the 7th century BCE, these Treres were nomadising in Western Asia along with the Cimmerians.

In 637 BCE, the Treres, under their king Kōbos and in alliance with the Cimmerians and the Lycians, attacked the Anatolian kingdom of Lydia during the seventh year of the reign of the Lydian king Ardys. They defeated the Lydians and captured their capital of Sardis except for its citadel, and Ardys might have been killed in this attack. Ardys's son and successor, Sadyattes, might possibly also have been killed in another Cimmerian attack on Lydia in 635 BCE.

Soon after 635 BCE, with the approval of the Neo-Assyrian Empire, which was an ally of Lydia as well as the then superpower in Western Asia, and in alliance with the Lydians, the Scythians under their king Madyes entered Anatolia, expelled the Treres from Asia Minor, and defeated the Cimmerians so that they no longer constituted a threat again, following which the Scythians extended their domination to Central Anatolia until they were themselves expelled by the Medes from Western Asia in the 600s BCE. This final defeat of the Cimmerians was carried out by the joint forces of Madyes, who Strabo credits with expelling the Cimmerians from Asia Minor, and of Sadyattes’s son and Ardys’s grandson, the Lydian king Alyattes, whom Herodotus of Halicarnassus and Polyaenus claim finally defeated the Cimmerians.

References

Sources

See also
Thracian tribes

Ancient tribes in Thrace
Thracian tribes